DD Kashir is a regional subsidiary television station  of Doordarshan in Jammu and Kashmir which is owned by Broadcasting Ministry of India centrally focusing on tradition of Kashmiri culture and heritage, telecasting from Doordarshan Kendra Srinagar, Jammu, Leh.

Doordarshan launched the channel to counter extremist Pakistani propaganda in the Kashmir valley. DD Kashir includes programmes focusing on Kashmiri culture and traditions and the history of Kashmir valley. One programme on Kashmir featured was Budhshah, which told the life of the historical Sultan Zain-ul-Abidin. It has in association with All India Radio established high power transmitters along the India-Pakistan border to counter Pakistani propaganda.
 Recently DD Kashir channel shifted to Freedish DTH Channel Number 85. So it can be received without any subscription at LCN 085.

History

DD Kashir is the Kashmiri language satellite channel supported by Doordarshan studios in Srinagar, Jammu and Leh. Launched in 2003  DD Kashir has entertainment serials, infotainment programmes, news & current affairs, social and cultural programmes and film programmes as its major content. In terrestrial mode, DD Kashir is available to 96% of the population of the valley.

It used to be operated from Delhi but in the year 2006, the Centre decided to shift the operations of Doordarshan's 'Kashir' channel back to Srinagar from Delhi after more than 17 years since the outbreak of violence in Kashmir in late 1980s, thus fulfilling a long-standing demand of the people of the Valley.

DD Kashir became a 24-hour channel from 15 August 2000. The channel used to telecast a 14 and half-hour programme daily. Out of these, commissioned programmes account for six hours, another four and half hours are taken by in-house and news/current affairs programmes while the archival programmes take four hours daily. The special audience programmes cover Gojri, Pahari, Ladakhi, Dogri, Shina, Balti, Pashto.

See also
 Ministry of Information and Broadcasting
 DD Free Dish
 List of South Asian television channels by country
 Kus Bani Koshur Karorpaet

References

Television stations in India
Foreign television channels broadcasting in the United Kingdom
Television channels and stations established in 1992
Direct broadcast satellite services
Indian direct broadcast satellite services
Mass media in Jammu and Kashmir